McKeehan is a surname. Notable people with the surname include:

Charles Louis McKeehan (1876–1925), American judge
Kevin Michael McKeehan (born 1964), better known as TobyMac, American musician, songwriter, and author
Michelle McKeehan (born 1989), American swimmer

See also
McKeegan